Görjen "Gugge" Hedrenius (October 2, 1938, Malmö - April 27, 2009, Stockholm) was a Swedish jazz pianist and bandleader.

Hedrenius was active in dixieland revival groups from his teens. He led a small group from 1959 to 1965 that included Idrees Sulieman and Bosse Broberg as sidemen. In 1971 he reinitiated the group as a big band and recorded under the name Big Blues Band, playing in Stockholm with the group into the 1990s and touring the United States in 1988. In Stockholm he led a jazz performing society called Gugge's Ballroom which arranged performances and hosted touring musicians, including Willie Cook, Joe Newman, Dizzy Gillespie, Mel Lewis, Teddy Edwards, Jimmy Witherspoon, and Hank Crawford.

References

1938 births
2009 deaths
Swedish jazz bandleaders
Swedish jazz pianists
20th-century pianists